Michael Gough (1916–2011) was an English actor.

Michael Gough may also refer to:
 Michael Gough (voice actor) (born 1956), American voice actor
 Michael Gough (cricketer) (born 1979), English cricketer and umpire
 Michael Gough (archaeologist), British archaeologist
 Michael Gough, Men's World Ice Hockey Championship player

See also
 Michael Goff (disambiguation)